Pachnephorus is a genus of leaf beetles in the subfamily Eumolpinae. It is distributed in Africa, Asia and Europe.

Species
Subgenus Pachnephorus

Pachnephorus achardi Zoia, 2007
Pachnephorus aequatorianus Zoia, 2007
Pachnephorus aethiopicus Zoia, 2007
Pachnephorus anceyi Pic, 1921
Pachnephorus baehri Zoia, 2007
Pachnephorus baeticus Weise, 1882
Pachnephorus baeticus baeticus Weise, 1882
Pachnephorus baeticus bruckii Fairmaire, 1862
Pachnephorus balyi Zoia, 2007
Pachnephorus beharui Zoia, 2007
Pachnephorus bertiae Zoia, 2007
Pachnephorus bezdeki Zoia, 2007
Pachnephorus bistriatus Mulsant & Wachanru, 1852
Pachnephorus bracarumvestitus Zoia, 2007
Pachnephorus brunneus Medvedev, 1957
Pachnephorus bryanti Zoia, 2007
Pachnephorus burgeoni Zoia, 2007
Pachnephorus camerunensis Zoia, 2007
Pachnephorus canus Weise, 1882
Pachnephorus clypeatus Baly, 1867
Pachnephorus conspersus Gerstaecker, 1871
Pachnephorus corinthius Fairmaire, 1862
Pachnephorus cristiani Zoia, 2007
Pachnephorus crocodilinus Zoia, 2007
Pachnephorus curtus Pic, 1921
Pachnephorus cylindricus H. Lucas, 1846
Pachnephorus daccordii Zoia, 2007
Pachnephorus danielssoni Zoia, 2007
Pachnephorus danielssoni congoanus Zoia, 2007
Pachnephorus danielssoni danielssoni Zoia, 2007
Pachnephorus demeyeri Zoia, 2007
Pachnephorus episternalis Zoia, 2007
Pachnephorus fabianae Zoia, 2007
Pachnephorus fasciatus Burgeon, 1941
Pachnephorus fasciatus fasciatus Burgeon, 1941
Pachnephorus fasciatus occidentalis Zoia, 2007
Pachnephorus fulvus Lopatin, 1976
Pachnephorus gardinii Zoia, 2007
Pachnephorus gerstaeckeri Zoia, 2007
Pachnephorus graecus Pic, 1901
Pachnephorus grobbelaarae Zoia, 2007
Pachnephorus hajeki Zoia, 2007
Pachnephorus hispidulus Fairmaire, 1866
Pachnephorus kaszabi Lopatin, 1962
Pachnephorus laevicollis Fairmaire, 1862
Pachnephorus lateralis Reitter, 1901
Pachnephorus latior Pic, 1921
Pachnephorus lewisi Baly, 1878
Pachnephorus lopatini Zoia, 2007
Pachnephorus malicus Zoia, 2007
Pachnephorus maroantsetranus Zoia, 2007
Pachnephorus medvedevi Zoia, 2007
Pachnephorus metallicus Bryant, 1959
Pachnephorus moseykoi Zoia, 2007
Pachnephorus pacificus Zoia, 2007
Pachnephorus parentorum Zoia, 2007
Pachnephorus pilosus (Rossi, 1790)
Pachnephorus poggii Zoia, 2007
Pachnephorus porosus Baly, 1878
Pachnephorus regalini Zoia, 2007
Pachnephorus rigatoi Zoia, 2007
Pachnephorus robustus Desbrochers des Loges, 1870
Pachnephorus ruficornis Lefèvre, 1876
Pachnephorus sassii Zoia, 2007
Pachnephorus senegalensis Achard, 1914
Pachnephorus shuteae Zoia, 2007
Pachnephorus sprecherae Zoia, 2007
Pachnephorus syriacus Reitter, 1886
Pachnephorus tessellatus (Duftschmid, 1825)
Pachnephorus testaceipes Fairmaire, 1880
Pachnephorus torridus Baly, 1878
Pachnephorus turcomanicus Medvedev, 1957
Pachnephorus uhligi Zoia, 2007
Pachnephorus villosus (Duftschmid, 1825)
Pachnephorus vitticollis Baly, 1867
Pachnephorus willersi Zoia, 2007
Pachnephorus yemenicus Lopatin, 2001

Subgenus Pachnephoriscus Lopatin, 1976
Pachnephorus jacobsoni Lopatin, 1976

Synonyms:
Pachnephorus convexicollis Baly, 1867: synonym of Pachnephorus bistriatus Mulsant & Wachanru, 1852

References

Eumolpinae
Chrysomelidae genera
Beetles described in 1836
Taxa named by Louis Alexandre Auguste Chevrolat
Beetles of Africa
Beetles of Asia
Beetles of Europe